Acinacodus is an extinct genus of amphidontid "eutriconodont" which existed in Shestakovo 1 locality in Western Siberia, Russia during the early Cretaceous period. It was described by A. V. Lopatin, E. N. Maschenko and A. O. Averianov in 2010, and the type species is Acinacodus tagaricus.

References

Fossil taxa described in 2010
Eutriconodonts
Extinct animals of Russia
Prehistoric mammal genera